Yang Chih-yuan may refer to:
 Jerry Yang (born 1968), Chinese name Yang Chih-yuan, Taiwanese-American entrepreneur and the co-founder of Yahoo! Inc
 Yang Chih-yuan (politician) (born 1990), Taiwanese nationalist politician
 Yang Chih-yuan, a Taiwanese student involved in a controversy about stamps designed for the International Day of Peace in 2004